The Río Grande de Añasco is a river in western Puerto Rico. The river flows through the municipalities of Mayagüez, Añasco, San Sebastián and Las Marías. The taínos called it Río Guaorabo.

History

In the 1898 Military Notes on Puerto Rico by the U.S. it is written that the "Añasco River is formed by the Lares Mountain ridge. It rises in the eastern extremity of the mountains called Tetas de Cerro Gordo, flowing first northwest, and then west, through the town of its name and thence to the sea."

It is spanned by the Puente de Añasco, a bridge listed on the National Register of Historic Places.

See also
 Puente de Añasco: NRHP listing in Añasco and Mayagüez, Puerto Rico
 List of rivers of Puerto Rico

References

Further reading
 Añasco River. The Columbia Gazetteer of North America. Columbia University Press, 2000. (Available online.)

External links
 USGS Hydrologic Unit Map – Caribbean Region (1974)
 Flooding from Río Grande de Añasco during Hurricane Maria in 2017

Rivers of Puerto Rico
Añasco, Puerto Rico
Mayagüez, Puerto Rico